Drážovce may refer to:
Drážovce (Banská Bystrica)
Drážovce church, in Nitra